Esplanade One is the largest shopping mall in the state of Odisha located at Bhubaneswar, designed by the Practice Design Pvt Ltd. It was developed by the Forum Group and The Blackstone Group. Esplanade One has a built-up area of 9.5 lakh sqft, including 4 lakh sqft of leasable area (Retail Space & 7 Screen Multiplex). It also includes 2.5 lakh sqft of offices and 3 lakh sqft of parking. The complex is spread over 9 floors and the offices start from the third floor.

About 
Esplanade One mall is located in Rasulgarh Industrial Estate Area, Bhubaneswar, Odisha, India. The mall has a total commercial (Built-up) space of 1,000,000 sq ft spread over ten floors designed by the Practice Design Pvt Ltd, with a Retail space of 400,000 sq ft. It is developed by Forum Group  in association with The Blackstone Group. It has capacity to contains more than 200 outlets, including cafeterias, food courts, restaurants, family entertainment zones, multiplex and it has multi level parking.

Events
Actress and model Disha Patani inaugurated the first Marks & Spencer Store in Bhubaneswar on 14 September 2018. The event was huge success and huge crowd gathered to witness the event at Esplanade One.
On 14 August 2018, Esplanade One organised The First Ever Midnight Sale at Odisha's No.1 Shopping & Entertainment Hub. Over 40 Brands offering 50% off. Also Get a Chance to win hourly exciting prizes including one lucky draw prize – Honda Activa 5G.

References

Shopping malls in Bhubaneswar
Shopping malls established in 2018
2018 establishments in Odisha